Busa is a surname. Notable people with the name include:

 Bianka Busa (born 1994), Serbian female volleyball player
 Roberto Busa (1913–2011), Italian Jesuit priest and pioneer of digital humanities
 Lance Busa (born 1994), Filipino singer and occasional actor
 Luigi Busà (born 1987), Italian karateka
 István Busa (born 1961), Hungarian fencer
 Julius Busa (1891–1917), Austro-Hungarian World War I flying ace

See also
 Bussa (surname)
 Busa (disambiguation)